Joševica is a village located just south of Glina in Banovina, central Croatia.

During the Croatian War of Independence, the village was ravaged in the December 1991 Joševica massacre.

References

External links

Populated places in Sisak-Moslavina County
Glina, Croatia